Those Were the Days... is a 1995 Hong Kong movie  directed by Billy Tang Hin-Shing.

Cast and roles
 Francis Ng - Yu
 Bowie Lam - Wah
 Maggie Siu - Ling
 Power Chan - Safe-Box
 Moses Chan - Ko Fai
 Kent Cheng - Chan's Father
 Ka-Kui Ho - Brother Wing / Devil Siu
 Victor Hon - Food Stall Owner
 Lee Siu-kei - Triad Boss
 Man Yee-Man - Kiddy
 Eric Moo - Chan Wah
 Kirk Wong - Big Nose
 Bobby Yip - Ugly Guy

External links
 IMDb entry

1995 films
Hong Kong crime drama films
Films directed by Billy Tang
1990s Hong Kong films